The Chosen Few: How Education Shaped Jewish History, 70-1492 is a 2012 book by Zvi Eckstein and Maristella Botticini. It won the 2012 National Jewish Book Award.

The book proposes theories about three economic aspects of Jewish history: the transition from agriculture to trade and other urban professions, the creation of the Jewish diaspora, and the decline of Jewish population particularly after the destruction of the Second Temple in 70 CE until the 7th century.

It has been translated to Italian and Hebrew, and was published by Tel Aviv University Press in 2013. As of 2014, the book is being translated to Spanish, Vietnamese, Polish, Chinese and French.

Overview
Cristiana Facchini of the Università di Bologna, describes the book as arguing that in the late Roman period Judaism was unique because it enforced "a communal regulation" to teach children Torah, with the result that Jews became a uniquely literate group. The Authors then apply modern choice analysis and economic behavior theory, and, in particular, the literature on religious affiliation as a matter of choice in an open market of ideas in which many options are available, portraying Jewish parents in the 1st through 7th centuries as being required to make an expensive choice to forgo the labor of children on the farm and, instead, pay tuition for an education that conferred no economic advantage in a community of peasant farmers. Many, according to Botticini and Eckstein, chose Christianity, resulting in the demographic decline of the Jewish community.

Botticini and Eckstein next theorize that the rise of Islam offered new opportunities in trade and craft production, reinforcing literacy among Jews, 70% of whom lived under Muslim governments in the Middle Ages. In Chapters 7 and 8, Botticini and Eckstein argue that the Jewish diaspora spread as Jews sought commercial opportunities in far off places, and were invited to settle by European rulers who sought their expertise in commerce, craft production and as physicians. In Cristiana Facchini words, this is The Chosen Few'''s "Grand Narrative," "literacy and economic performances. An inadvertent revolution was launched by rabbis in the midst of a great trauma (the fall of the temple and of the Jewish kingdom) leading to "compulsory religious education of male children," and thence, ultimately, to specialization in commerce and banking.

Botticini and Eckstein then ask why and how Jews came to specialize in money-lending, and answer, " “We show that the entry and then specialization of the Jews in lending money at interest can be explained by their comparative advantage in the four assets that were and still are the pillars of the financial intermediation: capital, networking, literacy and numeracy, and contract enforcement institutions.”

Reception
Reception in the popular press was enthusiastic.

Reviews by economists have been mixed. Carmel U. Chiswick called the book, "a very convincing Cliometric analysis that we can expect to inform all future economic histories of the Jews."

Writing in The Journal of Economic History, Philip Ackerman-Lieberman points out that Botticini and Eckstein support their theoretical model with, "assumptions about the
historical record which are by no means warranted. Their assumption that classical
rabbinic texts can be read as accurate depictions of historical reality leads them to the
conclusion that literacy and contract enforcement were universal Jewish institutions.
The evidence for either of these is thin at best—and, indeed, the work of Catherine Heszer in antiquity and Avner Greif in the medieval period suggests that these were
anything but what Botticini and Eckstein imagine!"  Furthermore, according to Ackerman-Lieberman, "Their reading of both the primary sources and the secondary literature on Jewish
demography is also tendentious, rejecting more recent advances in scholarship and
rereading medieval travelogues in the service of their historical narrative."

Some historians have been scathing. Robert Chazan, writing in The American Historical Review, described Chosen Few as "fashion(ing) a series of significant distortions." For Chazan, "the first major flaw in the book," is that the authors propose "one unified explanation" for the Jewish absence from farming and participation in banking, when, in fact these were a, "protracted and complex set of historical developments," taking place "over many centuries and in multiple venues," which, "cannot be clarified by one simple explanation." The availability of schooling to rural Jewish families in the 3rd to 6th is central to Botticcini and Eckstein's argument, but, according to Chazen, "There is no authority on late antique Judaism who would subscribe to the authors' portrayal of the evolution of Judaism during that period... That rabbis had the authority to erect the kind of perfected schooling system described in this book is—given the current state of research—unthinkable."  Chazan calls their assessment of rabbinic sources, "incorrect." Writing in GeneWatch, Diana Muir and Paul Appelbaum question whether the late Roman era "selection event" in which Botticini and Eckstein claim that Jews who chose not to educate their children converted to Christianity "ever occurred," describing Botticini and Eckstein's reliance on population numbers not supported by the sources they cite, or by scholarship.

References

External links
1.	(19 October 2012). Interview with Zvi Eckstein in TheJewishChannelTJC channel in YouTube

2.	The book in Princeton University Press site

3.	The book in JSTOR

4.	Book Summary in Investing Audio Book Reviews channel in YouTube

5.	Temin, Peter. Book Review. Journal of Economic Literature (published by American Economic Association, Volume. 51, Issue 1 (2012), pp, 215-218.
 
6.	Weiss, Steven. (9 November 2012). "The Chosen Few - Has an emphasis on education been bad for the Jewish population?", Slate.

7.	Ackerman-Lieberman, Phillip I. Book Review. The Journal of Economic History, Volume 73, Issue 1, March 2013, pp 310–311.

8.	Chazan, Robert. Book Review. The American Historical Review (2014) 119 (1): 229-230.

9.	Chiswick, Carmel U. Book Review. EH.Net, owned and operated by the Economic History Association (January 2013)
 
11.	Krasner, Jonathan B. (August 28, 2012). "What Was Driving Force Behind Jewish History?", Forward – The Jewish Daily.
 
12.	Williams, Matthew. Book Review. June 14, 2013. pages 161-164.

13.	Levin, Michael (July 10, 2013). "Why Did Jews Become Moneylenders? Because They Could", The Huffington Post''.

14.	Warsh, David (January 27, 2013). "Who Did the Choosing?", economicprincipals.com

15.	Botticini, Maristella (April 18, 2013). "The Chosen Few: A New Explanation of Jewish Success", pbs.org.

16.	Gluck, Robert. "Authors examine education's impact on Jewish history". Heritage – Florida Jewish News. August 8, 2014, Year 37, No. 47.

History books about Jews and Judaism
2012 non-fiction books
Princeton University Press books